Year 346 (CCCXLVI) was a common year starting on Wednesday (link will display the full calendar) of the Julian calendar. In the Roman Empire, it was known as the Year of the Consulship of Constantius and Claudius (or, less frequently, year 1099 Ab urbe condita). The denomination 346 for this year has been used since the early medieval period, when the Anno Domini calendar era became the prevalent method in Europe for naming years.

Events 
 By place 
 Asia 
 In Korea, the Buyeo Kingdom is absorbed by Goguryeo.
 Geunchogo becomes king of the Korean kingdom of Baekje.

 By topic 
 Religion 
 Emperor Constans I uses his influence to secure the return of Athanasius. He is restored as Patriarch of Alexandria, and documents are compiled relating to his expulsion, under the title Apology Against the Arians.
 Macedonius I, Patriarch of Constantinople, is deposed again by Paul I.
 Julius Firmicus Maternus writes De erroribus profanarum religionum.
 The Visigoths are converted to Arianism by Wulfila.

Births 
 Zhang Tianxi, Chinese ruler of Former Liang (d. 406)

Deaths 
 He Chong (or Cidao), Chinese politician (b. 292)
 Maximin of Trier, German bishop (approximate date)
 Zhang Jun (or Gongting), Chinese prince (b. 307)

References